The 2008–09 Scottish First Division was the fourteenth season of the First Division in its current format of ten teams.

Promotion and relegation from 2007–08

SPL & First Division
Promoted from First Division to Scottish Premier League
 Hamilton Academical

First & Second Divisions
Relegated from First Division to Second Division
 Stirling Albion
Promoted from Second Division to First Division
 Ross County (champions)
 Airdrie United (losing play-off finalists, promoted due to Gretna's relegation to Division Three)

League table

Results
Teams play each other four times in this league. In the first half of the season each team plays every other team twice (home and away) and then do the same in the second half of the season.

First half of season

Second half of season

Top scorers

Source: The League Insider

Attendance

Source: The League Insider

Kits and shirt sponsors

Managerial changes

Monthly awards

First Division play-offs

Semi-finals
The ninth placed team in the First Division played the fourth placed team in the Second Division and third placed team in the Second Division played the second placed team in the Second Division. The play-offs were played over two legs, the winning team in each semi-final advanced to the final.

First legs

Second legs

Final
The two semi-final winners played each other over two legs. The winning team was awarded a place in the 2009–10 First Division.

First leg

Second leg

References

Scottish First Division seasons
1
2008–09 in Scottish football leagues
Scot